The New York State Office for the Prevention of Domestic Violence is a New York state government agency within the Executive Department created in 1992 tasked to help New York state residents deal with domestic violence in their lives and those of their friends, family, neighbors, and acquaintances in the state. Its current executive director is Gwen Wright.

The office played an important role in the passage of the state's strangulation law in 2010 which classifies the intent to kill with that method of harm as a felony: If an offender releases their grip within a certain period of time, there is usually no evidence what transpired. Then-executive director Amy Barash expressed in 2013, when asked about progress up to then: "The number of homicides has gone down over the past twenty-five years.... A lot of the legal progress is due to the federal Violence Against Women Act.

Executive directors
Kelli Owens, 2019-Present
Gwen Wright, 2012–2019
Amy Barasch, 2007–12

References

https://opdv.ny.gov/about-us

External links
official website

1992 establishments in New York (state)
State agencies of New York (state)
Domestic violence-related organizations in the United States
Violence in New York (state)